Sasha Rebecca Spielberg (born May 14, 1990), also known by her stage name Buzzy Lee, is an American actress and musician.

Life and career
Spielberg was born at Cedars-Sinai Medical Center in Los Angeles, the daughter of film director Steven Spielberg and actress Kate Capshaw. Her father is from an Orthodox Jewish family, and her mother is a Jewish convert. She is their first child together, although each have children from previous relationships. She has three sisters: Mikaela Spielberg, Destry Spielberg, and half-sister Jessica Capshaw, as well as three brothers: Sawyer Spielberg, Theo Spielberg, and half-brother Max Spielberg. She graduated from Brown University.

Spielberg has acted in several of her father's movies, including The Terminal, Munich, Indiana Jones and the Kingdom of the Crystal Skull, and The Post. She performed in the band Wardell (previously known as Brother/Sister) with her brother Theo. Their Brother/Sister EP The Accidental Zoo was released on April 4, 2011. Their album Love/Idleness was released in 2015.

Spielberg has collaborated with composer and fellow Brown University alumnus Nicolas Jaar under the name Just Friends. They released a cover of Leonard Cohen's "Avalanche" and an original song, "Don't Tell Me."

In 2015, Spielberg produced, wrote for, and starred in Snapchat's first mobile series, Literally Can't Even. She also shares her mini-improv sketches on Instagram. On April 27, 2018, she released her solo EP Facepaint, with five songs.

Spielberg has also collaborated with rapper and producer JPEGMafia on several occasions, the first in 2019 on JPEGMafia's song "Dots Freestyle Remix", from his third studio album, "All My Heroes Are Cornballs", where Spielberg was a featured artist. They collaborated again on the song "Nemo!" on JPEGMafia's fourth studio album, "LP!". She has also collaborated with rapper Denzel Curry on the song "John Wayne" on Curry's fourth studio album "Melt My Eyez See Your Future". The song was produced by JPEGMafia.

Personal life
In May 2022, Spielberg married Harry McNally, son of restaurateur Keith McNally.

Filmography

Discography

References

External links

Living people
20th-century American actresses
21st-century American actresses
21st-century American singers
Actresses from Los Angeles
American child actresses
American film actresses
American people of Ukrainian-Jewish descent
Brown University alumni
Family of Steven Spielberg
Jewish American actresses
1990 births